Grape drinks (also known as grape soda, grape pop, or purple drink in certain regions of the U.S.) are sweetened drinks with a grape flavor and a deep purple color. They may be carbonated (for example, Fanta) or not (Kool-Aid).

Grapeade first appeared as a variety of carbonated drink provided in soda fountains in American drugstores in the late nineteenth century, brands including Miner's and Lash's. A recipe for homemade grapeade appears in editions of Fannie Farmer's cookbook.

Today, most commercially available grape sodas are based on artificial flavorings such as methyl anthranilate designed to simulate Concord grapes, and are colored deep purple with food coloring.

Hard grape sodas have been marketed by, e.g., Henry's Hard Soda. It is also possible to use non-alcoholic grape sodas in alcoholic cocktails, such as a grape soda whiskey cocktail, or frozen grape daiquiri.

See also

 List of brand name soft drinks products
 List of soft drink flavors
 List of soft drink producers
 List of soft drinks by country

References 

Soft drink flavors
 
Drink